Ziyed Chennoufi (born November 29, 1988) is a German-Tunisian basketball player for Club Africain and the Tunisian national team.

He participated at the AfroBasket 2017.

References

External links

1988 births
Living people
Tunisian men's basketball players
German men's basketball players
Sportspeople from Hagen
Club Africain basketball players
Riesen Ludwigsburg players
VfL Kirchheim Knights players
Small forwards
Phoenix Hagen players
German people of Tunisian descent
2019 FIBA Basketball World Cup players
Ezzahra Sports players
21st-century Tunisian people